Ikungu is a town in central Tanzania.

Transport 

It is served by a station on the Central Railway of Tanzania.

See also 

 Railway stations in Tanzania

References 

Populated places in Singida Region